Igualada is a municipality in the province of Barcelona in Catalonia, Spain. It is located on the left bank of the Anoia River and at the western end of the Igualada-Martorell-Barcelona Railway. Igualada is the capital and central market of the Anoia comarca, a rich agricultural and wine-producing district. The population, is 38,918.

The city consists of an old town, founded in the 11th century, with narrow and irregular streets, including the remains of a fortress and ramparts, plus a new surrounding town with regular and spacious streets and many fine houses.

Igualada hosts the European Balloon Festival, the largest hot air balloon festival in Spain and one of the largest in Europe. It has taken place every year, since 1997, at the beginning of July. The city also hosts the Aerosport airshow, which takes place every year in April or May.

History

COVID-19 pandemic
Igualada was hard hit by the COVID-19 pandemic in Spain. Its hospital was identified as it was a hotspot of the coronavirus. Police guard every entry and exit point, and allow only essential workers to enter or leave. Igualada has been cut off from the rest of the country, as a lockdown within a lockdown.

Main sights

Igualada Leather Museum 

The Igualada Leather Museum (Museu de la Pell d'Igualada) opened in 1954. It was the first leather museum in Spain and the third in Europe. The collections are displayed in two nearby buildings in Igualada: the "Cal Boyer" building, a former cotton textile factory from the late 19th century, and the "Cal Granotes" building, an 18th-century tannery.

"Cal Granotes" displays two floors of a typical tannery: the ground floor, where the leather preparation and tanning was done, and the upper floor, where the leather was dried hanging from bars.

In the early 18th century, the tanning workers from Igualada decided to leave the enclosure of the medieval walls and established new industries along a water pipe or irrigation ditch named "El Rec", already mentioned in 12th-century documents and previously used by mills.

Muleteer's Museum (Museu del Traginer)

The "Igualada Muleteer's Museum - Antoni Ros Collection" explains the evolution of transport using animals such as mules, horses, oxen, and the different relationships that paved the way for the profession of muleteer. It is distributed into three main thematic areas: professions, saddles and bridles, and carriages.

Igualada Cemetery 

The new Igualada Cemetery was designed by the architects Enric Miralles and Carme Pinós after winning an architectural competition in 1984. Constructed between 1985 and 1994 as a replacement for the old "Cemetery Vell", it has become widely regarded as one of the most poetic works of the 20th century Catalan architecture. Enric Miralles, who died in year 2000 is buried in one of the tombs.

Church of Santa Maria

The Basilica of Santa Maria is the most important historical building of Igualada. The first settlement of Igualada is dated around year 1000, in the location were the current church lies today, which was at that time a crossing of two routes which were linking Barcelona with Aragon, and north of Catalonia with its south. Santa Maria church origin is from the 11th century, but the current building is mainly from the 17th century. During the Spanish Civil War it was converted into a market, and was restored after the war, under the guidance of the architect Cèsar Martinell. In 1949 Santa Maria obtained the title of Minor Basilica granted by the pope Pius XII.

Nursing home "Asil del Sant Crist"
The asil del Sant Crist is one of the most special buildings in Igualada and serves as a nursing home of elder people. Construction started in year 1931 thanks to a donation from Magdalena, Dolors and Concepció Castells and finished in 1941 after the Spanish Civil War. It was designed by Joan Rubió i Bellver, pupil of Antoni Gaudí, in late modernisme style, mixed with influences from the traditional Catalan architecture.

Economy
The local industries, mainly developed since 1880, include the manufacture of cotton, linen, wool, ribbons, cloth, chocolate, soap, brandies, leather, cards and nails.

Igualada has a long tradition of tanning and textile industries. The competition from low-cost countries that produce inexpensive textile products and the stricter environmental laws applied on tanneries have had a serious impact on the local economy. Despite that, there are several well-known textile companies that keep their headquarters in Igualada, including Buff, Sita Murt and Punto Blanco.

Igualada is also home to Ultramagic, the only manufacturer of hot air balloons in Spain.

Transportation
Igualada's railway station is the terminus of a line connecting with Plaça d'Espanya in Barcelona. The A-2 motorway between Madrid and Barcelona bypasses the town.

Sports 
Igualada is home to the Igualada Hoquei Club, founded in 1950 and one of the top roller hockey clubs in Europe, having won the European Champions League of Rink Hockey six times and the Spanish League five times.
The local soccer team is CF Igualada, founded in 1939 and currently playing at the Primera Catalana league.
 There is also a local Rugby Union Team, Anoia Rugby, who were founded in 2013 and ply their trade in Catalonia's third rugby division.
Pep Clotet, football manager and former player, comes from Igualada.

International relations

Twin towns – Sister cities
Igualada is twinned with:
 Lecco, Italy
 Guimarães, Portugal
 Alcántara, Spain
 Nueva Esperanza, Jiquilisco, El Salvador
 Aksakovo, Bulgaria

References 

 Panareda Clopés, Josep Maria; Rios Calvet, Jaume; Rabella Vives, Josep Maria (1989). Guia de Catalunya, Barcelona: Caixa de Catalunya.  (Spanish).  (Catalan).

External links 
 Igualada tourism office  
 Igualada official site 
 Government data pages 

 
Municipalities in Anoia